ESP most commonly refers to:

 Extrasensory perception, a paranormal ability

ESP may also refer to:

Arts, entertainment

Music 

 ESP Guitars, a manufacturer of electric guitars
 E.S. Posthumus, an independent music group formed in 2000, that produces cinematic style music
 ESP-Disk, a 1960s free-jazz record label based in New York
 The Electric Soft Parade, a British band formed in 2001
 Eric Singer Project, side project founded in the 1990s by musician Eric Singer
 ESP, a collaboration between Space Tribe and other artists

Songs, albums 

 E.S.P. (Bee Gees album), 1987 album by the Bee Gees
 "E.S.P." (song), title track of the album
 E.S.P. (Extra Sexual Persuasion), 1983 album by soul singer Millie Jackson
 E.S.P. (Miles Davis album), 1965 album by Miles Davis
 "E.S.P.", 1977 song by Masayoshi Takanaka from the album An Insatiable High
 "E.S.P.", 1978 song by Buzzcocks from the album Love Bites
 "E.S.P.", 1988 song by Cacophony from the album Go Off!
 "E.S.P.", 1990 Song by Deee-Lite from the album "World Clique"
 ESP, 2000 album by The System
 "ESP", 2017 song by N.E.R.D. from the album No One Ever Really Dies
 "ESP", 2022 song by Beach House from the album Once Twice Melody

Television 

 "E.S.P." (UFO), a 1970 episode of UFO
 E.S.P. (TV series), a horror Philippine drama by GMA Network

Technology 

 Electric submersible pump, an artificial lift system that electrically drives multiple centrifugal stage pumps to lift oil and water from wells
 Electro-selective pattern, Olympus-proprietary metering technology for digital cameras
 Electron spin trapping, a scientific technique
 Electronic skip protection in portable CD players
 Electronic stability control, also known as Electronic Stability Program, a computer device used in cars to improve traction
 Electrostatic precipitator, a device that removes particles from a flowing gas
 Enterprise Simulation Platform, the Lockheed-Martin commercial version of the Microsoft Flight Simulator X franchise, now called Prepar3D.
 Equalizing snoop probe, a high-speed digital signal probe by Agilent
 External static pressure, the air pressure faced by a fan blowing into an air duct in a heating, ventilation, and air conditioning system
 External stowage platform, a type of cargo platform used on the International Space Station

Computing 

 Euclidean shortest path, the problem of finding a route between two points while avoiding obstacles
 EFI system partition, a partition used by machines that adhere to the Extensible Firmware Interface
 'Elder Scrolls plugin', the .ESP file-format used in computer games such as The Elder Scrolls III: Morrowind
 Email service provider (marketing), an organization offering e-mail services
 Psychology of programming is sometimes referred to as 'empirical study of programming' or ESP
 Encapsulating Security Payload, an encryption protocol within the IPsec suite
 ESP game, an online human computation game
 Event stream processing, technology that acts on data streams
 ESP Cheat (video games), displaying contextual info such as the health, name and position of other participants (normally hidden from the player).
 Extended Stack Pointer register in Intel IA-32 (x86/32-bit) assembler
 Various processors by Espressif Systems, like the ESP32 or the ESP8266

Business 

 Easy Software Products, a software-development company, originator of the Common UNIX Printing System (CUPS)
 Email service provider, a specialist organisation that offers bulk email marketing services
 Entertainment Software Publishing, a Japanese video-game publisher

Spain and Spanish 

 3-letter code for Spain in ISO 3166-1 alpha-3
 Spanish language (Español), non-ISO language code
 Spanish peseta, the ISO 4217 code for the former currency of Spain

Other uses 

 Eastern State Penitentiary, a museum in Philadelphia, former prison
 Effective Sensory Projection, a term used in the Silva self-help method
 Empire State Plaza in Albany, New York, U.S.A
 Empire State Pullers, a New York tractor pulling circuit
 English for specific purposes, a subset of English language learning and teaching
 Equally spaced polynomial in mathematics
 European Skeptics Podcast (TheESP), a weekly podcast representing several European skeptic organisations in Europe
 Extra-solar planet, a planet located outside the Solar System
 Ezilenlerin Sosyalist Partisi, a Turkish political party
 Extracellular polymeric substance, produced by bacteria for aggregation and gliding mobility